Gregory Allen Engel (born January 18, 1971) is a former American football center who played five seasons in the National Football League (NFL) with the San Diego Chargers and Detroit Lions. He played college football at The University of Illinois and attended Bloomington High School in Bloomington, Illinois. He was also a member of the Berlin Thunder of NFL Europe.

References

External links
 Just Sports Stats

Living people
1971 births
American football centers
Berlin Thunder players
Detroit Lions players
Illinois Fighting Illini football players
San Diego Chargers players
Bloomington High School (Bloomington, Illinois) alumni
Sportspeople from Davenport, Iowa
Players of American football from Iowa